The 1951 Lady Wigram Trophy was a motor race held at the Wigram Airfield Circuit in New Zealand on 31 March 1951. It was the first Lady Wigram Trophy to be held and was won by Les Moore in the Alfa Romeo Tipo B.

Classification

References

Lady Wigram Trophy
Lady
March 1951 sports events in New Zealand